The W. J. McConnell House is a historic house in Moscow, Idaho. It was built in 1886 for William J. McConnell, who served as the third governor of Idaho from 1893 to 1897. It was sold out of the McConnell family in 1901.

The building was designed in the Stick/Eastlake architectural style. It has been listed on the National Register of Historic Places since November 21, 1974.

References

Houses on the National Register of Historic Places in Idaho
National Register of Historic Places in Latah County, Idaho
Stick-Eastlake architecture in the United States
Houses completed in 1886